The Southern Illinois River-to-River Conference (SIRR) is a high school athletic conference represented by 12 schools in southern Illinois.  The conference is divided into two divisions.  While technically in the same conference each division crowns its own champion, and each winner is regarded as the conference champion as if they were in two separate conferences.  Schools are only required to play other schools within their own division although cross-divisional play is very common.

History 

Seven of the charter members of the River-to-River Conference were members of the old Southwest Egyptian Conference.  Around 1991, the Southwest Egyptian was approached by Benton, Herrin, Harrisburg, and West Frankfort for membership; these four schools were concerned over their small size relative to the other members of the South Seven Conference (where all four were then located) and sought out a conference more in line with their size.  Massac County (then an independent school) was approached about becoming a member, and in 1993 the Southern Illinois River-to-River Conference was formed.

At the start of the 2010–2011 school year Carterville left the Black Diamond Conference to join the Southern Illinois River-to-River Conference. Chester High School has taken their place in the Black Diamond Conference.

On June 12, 2020, it was announced that Sparta High School will depart for the Cahokia Conference the 2020–2021 school year, and the 11 remaining members were looking into potential replacements.

Current members of the Southern Illinois River-to-River Conference

Current members

Former Members

References

External links
 Conference Website

High school sports conferences and leagues in the United States
Illinois high school sports conferences
High school sports in Illinois
Sports leagues established in 1993
1993 establishments in Illinois